A perennial candidate is a political candidate who frequently runs for elected office and rarely, if ever, wins. Perennial candidates' existence lies in the fact that in some countries, there are no laws that limit a number of times a person can run for office, or laws that impose a non-negligible financial penalty on registering to run for election.

Definition
A number of modern articles related to electoral politics or elections have identified those who have run for elected office and lost two to three times, and then decide to mount a campaign again as perennial candidates. However, some articles have listed a number of notable exceptions.

Some who have had their campaign applications rejected by their country's electoral authority multiple times have also been labelled as perennial candidates.

Reason for running
It has been noted that some perennial candidates take part in an election with the aim of winning, and some do have ideas to convey on the campaign trail, regardless of their chance for winning.

Some perennial candidates may mount a run as a way to help strengthen his or her party's standing in a parliamentary body, in an effort to become kingmaker in the event of a political stalemate.

Some perennial candidates have been accused of running for office continuously as a way to get public election funding. Some have also been accused of being backed by the government of their country, in an effort to make the government appear more rational in comparison.

Americas

Argentina
Jorge Altamira, leader of the Trotskyist Workers' Party, has run for President five times (1989, 1995, 1999, 2003 and 2011). His best performance was in 2011, with 2.30% of the votes.
 Nicolás del Caño, leader of the Socialist Workers' Party has run for political positions five times (2013, 2015, 2017, 2019 and 2021). His best performance was in 2019, with 2.16% of the votes.

Brazil
Due to the complex and intricate political system in Brazil concerning political parties, there are more than 30 political parties. In this scenario, it is very useful to have hopeless candidates who can make a good number of votes and increase the overall votes count of a party (or coalition). As a consequence, there are thousands of small perennial candidates for local elections around the country, whose sole purpose is helping others get elected, then ask for a job in the elected government cabinet.

José Maria Eymael, a fringe political figure, ran for the Presidency six times (1998, 2006, 2010, 2014, 2018 and 2022); he failed to reach 1% of the votes in any of those. He also unsuccessfully ran for mayor of São Paulo in 1985 and 1992, though he won two terms on the lower house of the National Congress of Brazil, from 1987 to 1995.
Rui Costa Pimenta, leader and founder of the Trotskyist Workers' Cause Party (PCO), ran for the Presidency in 2002, 2010 and 2014 (his candidacy in 2006 was blocked by the Superior Electoral Court). He was last in all his runs, with his best performance being 0.04% of the votes in 2002.
 Vera Guasso, labor union leader and member of the Unified Socialist Workers Party (PSTU), ran for the Porto Alegre city assembly, mayor of Porto Alegre, the Brazilian Senate and other positions in a non-stop serial candidacy (every two years) from the early 90s on. In her best results, she had numbers of votes in local Porto Alegre elections similar to those of lesser-voted elected candidates but did not get a seat due to her party's overall voting being small. PSTU traditionally enters elections with no visible chance to, allegedly, "put a leftist set of points in discussion" and "build the party" but has lately achieved some expressive numbers.
Enéas Carneiro, a cardiologist and founder of the far-right Party of the Reconstruction of the National Order (PRONA), ran for presidency three times, in 1989, 1994 and 1998. He was mostly known for his comical style of speech on political broadcasts (due in part to the reduced TV time his party had) and his distinct beard. He also ran for mayor in São Paulo at the 2000 elections, before finally being elected federal deputy in 2002 with record voting. He was re-elected in 2006 but died in 2007 from myeloid leukemia.
José Maria de Almeida, leader of the Trotskyist United Socialist Workers' Party (PSTU), ran for the Presidency on four occasions: 1998, 2002, 2010 and 2014. His best performance was in 2002 when he got 0.47% of the votes.
Levy Fidelix, leader and founder of the conservative Brazilian Labour Renewal Party (PRTB), ran for all municipal and general elections held in Brazil from 1996 to 2020. He was twice candidate for the Presidency (in 2010 and 2014), twice candidate for the Government of São Paulo (in 1998 and 2002) and five times candidate for the Prefecture of São Paulo (in 1996, 2008, 2012, 2016 and 2020), never being elected for any position in his political career. He succumbed to COVID-19 on 23 April 2021.

Canada
 Don Andrews, leader of the unregistered Nationalist Party of Canada has run for Mayor of Toronto several times, 1972, 1974, 1976, 1988, 1991, 1994, 1997, 2003, 2010 and most recently in 2014, when he came in seventh place with 0.10% of the vote.
 Michael Baldasaro (1949–2016), a leader of the pro-marijuana Church of the Universe, ran for Mayor of Hamilton, Ontario in 1988, 1991, 1994, 2000, 2003, 2006, 2010, and 2014 and, among other federal and provincial campaigns, attempted to seek the leadership of the Progressive Conservative Party of Canada in 1988.
 Douglas Campbell has run as a fringe candidate for the House of Commons in the 1960s, the leadership of both the Ontario and federal New Democratic Party in the 1970s and 1980s, and Mayor of North York, Ontario. He ran for Mayor of Toronto in 2000, 2003 and 2006.
 Ross Dowson, leader of the Canadian Trotskyist group the Revolutionary Workers Party (later the League for Socialist Action) ran for Mayor of Toronto nine times in the 1940s, 1950s, and 1960s. His best result was in 1949, when he won 20% of the vote in a two-man race. He also ran twice for the House of Commons of Canada.
 Terry Duguid is a Manitoba politician who has run multiple times for city council, mayor and MP in Winnipeg. He lost the 1995 Winnipeg Civic election and lost the 2004 and 2006 federal elections in Kildonan—St. Paul, then ran and lost in Winnipeg South in 2011. He ran in Winnipeg South again in 2015, this time winning the seat with 58% of the vote. He was re-elected for Winnipeg South in 2019 with 42% of the vote.
Jim Enos, a Hamilton, Ontario-based social conservative and Christian activist, has sought elected office nine times over three decades. Enos ran provincially in 1999, 2007, 2011, and 2018, federally in the riding of Hamilton Mountain in 2011, 2015, 2019, and 2021, and for the public school board in the 2003 Hamilton Municipal Election. Enos has run with the Family Coalition Party of Ontario, Christian Heritage Party of Canada, and as an independent.
 Henri-Georges Grenier ran 13 times for the House of Commons of Canada between 1945 and 1980 on the tickets of a variety of political parties, for each of which he was the sole candidate.
 Ben Kerr, a street musician, ran for Mayor of Toronto seven times between 1985 and his death in 2005. He was best known for his country music performances and for advocating the medicinal benefits of drinking a concoction that has cayenne pepper as its main ingredient.
 Patricia Métivier contested 24 Canadian federal, provincial or municipal elections from 1972 to 2001.
 David Popescu has run for federal, provincial, and municipal office multiple times since 1998 on an extreme anti-abortion and anti-gay platform. While campaigning in the 2008 election, he advocated the execution of homosexual people, which precipitated charges under Canada's hate crime laws.
 Naomi Rankin ran for the Communist Party of Canada in 2008, her eighth attempt at becoming an MP. She has also run six times for the Communist Party of Alberta, all of which were also unsuccessful.
 Alex Tyrrell, leader of the Green Party of Quebec, has run 11 times between 2012 and 2022 for provincial general elections and by-elections.
 John Turmel is in the Guinness Book of World Records for being the candidate who has the "most elections contested" and lost 103 as of October 2022 (he also ran in a by-election canceled due to a general election).
 Harry Bradley ran for the Toronto Board of Control 24 times between 1930 and 1964. He also ran for mayor in 1960 and 1962, and for city council in 1969.
 Kevin Clarke is a homeless person who has unsuccessfully contested municipal, provincial and federal offices in Toronto numerous times from the 1990s to the present, often as leader of The People's Political Party.
 Régent Millette is a teacher in Quebec who has run for public office at the municipal, provincial, and federal levels over 25 times since 2000.
 Don Woodstock of Winnipeg has contested several positions at all three levels of government. He unsuccessfully ran for provincial seats in 2007 and 2011 as a Liberal, and in 2016 as an independent. He ran federally in 2015 as a Green candidate, and received national attention after being called a "son of a bitch" by NDP incumbent Pat Martin during a televised debate. Woodstock ran for city council in 2014 and ran as a mayoral candidate in the 2018 election.
 Paul Fromm, is a Anti immigration activist who has ran in many municipal, provincial and federal office elections. In 1988 federal election ran in Mississauga East, 2010 municipal election and 2014 municipal election Ran for mayor of Mississauga, 2011 Canadian federal election for Calgary Southeast, 2018 municipal election ran for Mayor of Hamilton, and 2018 general election for Etobicoke Centre.

Chile
Salvador Allende unsuccessfully ran for the national presidency in the 1952, 1958, and 1964 elections before winning in the 1970 Chilean presidential election.
Marco Enríquez-Ominami, Progressive Party (Chile) presidential candidate since the 2009–10 Chilean presidential election.

Colombia
Horacio Serpa Uribe, three-times Liberal Party's presidential candidate (1998, 2002, 2006).
Antanas Mockus, two-times presidential candidate (2006, 2010), one-time vicepresidential candidate (1998).
Noemí Sanín, three-times Conservative Party's presidential candidate (1998, 2002, 2010).
Álvaro Gómez Hurtado, three times Conservative Party's presidential candidate (1974, 1986, 1990).
Enrique Peñalosa, five-times Bogotá's mayor candidate (1994, 1997, 2007, 2011, 2015), one-time senatorial candidate (2006), one-time presidential candidate (2014).
Gustavo Petro, three-times presidential candidate (2010, 2018, 2022) Elected in 2022.
Sergio Fajardo, two-times presidential candidate (2018, 2022), one-time vice presidential candidate (2010).
Regina 11, three-times presidential candidate (1986, 1990, 1994).

Costa Rica
 Otto Guevara, a five-time presidential candidate.
 Walter Muñoz, a five-time presidential candidate.
 Máximo Fernández Alvarado, a three-time presidential candidate.

Ecuador
Álvaro Noboa ran unsuccessfully for president in 1998, 2002, 2006, 2009 and 2013; he attempted to run for president in 2021 but his candidacy was suspended by the electoral authorities due to an alleged violation of registration requirements.

Mexico
Nicolás Zúñiga y Miranda was a presidential candidate 10 times: 1892, 1896, 1900, 1904, 1910, 1911, 1913, 1917, 1920 and 1924 and also tried to run for a seat in the Congress of Mexico at least twice. The eccentric Zúñiga never got more than a few votes, but always claimed to have been the victim of fraud and considered himself to be the legitimate President.
Cuauhtémoc Cárdenas was a presidential candidate three times: 1988, 1994 and 2000, also was elected the first Head of Government of Mexico City in 1997, was the leader of PRD, the left-wing mayor party and was Governor of the state of Michoacan.

Andrés Manuel López Obrador ran unsuccessfully for president two times, in 2006 and 2012, before being elected president in 2018. He failed to acknowledge the results of his first presidential loss in 2006, protesting for months in the capital of the country during the aftermath.

Paraguay
Domingo Laíno ran unsuccessfully for president three times: 1989, 1993, and 1998. His best performance was in 1998, with 43.88% of the votes.
Efraín Alegre was a presidential candidate two times: 2013 and 2018, while currently running for president for a third time in 2023. His best performance was in 2018, with 45.08% of the votes.

Peru 
Roger Cáceres, FRENATRACA presidential candidate in 1980 with 2% of the vote, 1985 with 2% of the vote and 1990 with 1.3% of the vote.
Ezequiel Ataucusi, FREPAP presidential candidate in 1990 with 1.1% of the vote, in 1995 with 0.8% of votes and in 2000 with 0.75% of votes.
Ricardo Noriega, presidential candidate for All for Victory in 2001 with 0.31% of the vote and for Desperate National in 2011 with 0.15% of the vote. He was also a candidate from Independent Civic Union for senator in 1990.
Andrés Alcántara, presidential candidate of Direct Democracy in 2021 with 0.29% of the vote. He also was not elected as a congressman in the 2000 elections, 2016 and 2020, and as Mayor of Santiago de Chuco.
Ciro Gálvez ran unsuccessfully for president three times in 2001, 2006 and the most recent in 2021 and ran unsuccessfully for Governor twice in 2002 and 2006. 
Keiko Fujimori, the daughter of former president Alberto Fujimori ran unsuccessfully for president three times in 2011, 2016 and 2021, each time losing in the run-off.
Jaime Salinas, candidate for mayor of Lima in 2002 and 2018 and presidential in 2006, without being elected and with low percentages such as 0.53% in the 2006 presidential elections and 3.5% in the 2018 municipal elections.
Verónika Mendoza, ran unsuccessfully for president in 2016 and 2021, did not qualify for the run-off in both rounds 
Fernando Olivera ran unsuccessfully for president four times in 2001, 2006, 2016 and 2021 in which in 2006, he withdrew from the race and in 2021, his candidacy was rejected. 
Máximo San Román ran for the vice presidency four times between 1990, 1995, 2006 and 2011 in which, in 1990, he was successful and ran for the presidency on in 2000.

United States

Africa

Benin
Bruno Amoussou, leader of the Social Democratic Party, ran for President four times (1991, 1996, 2001 and 2006).

Gambia
Sheriff Mustapha Dibba, leader of the National Convention Party, ran for President four times (1982, 1987, 1992 and 2001).
Ousainou Darboe, leader of the United Democratic Party, has run for President four times (1996, 2001, 2006 and 2011).

Ghana
Nana Akufo-Addo, flagbearer of the New Patriotic Party, ran for president in 2008, 2012 and won in 2016 and 2020
Edward Mahama, leader of the People's National Convention, has run for President four times (1996, 2000, 2004 and 2008)

Kenya
Raila Odinga leader of Orange Democratic Movement has been on the ballot five times—1997, 2007, 2013, 2017 and 2022 losing every single time . Prior to that and under the old Kenyan Constitution, Raila was a Member of Parliament for the Lang'ata Constituency Raila who is referred to as 'Baba' by his followers.

Mozambique
 Afonso Dhlakama contested the presidency in 1994, 1999, 2004, 2009 and 2014.

Nigeria
Atiku Abubakar ran for president in 1993, 2007, 2015, 2019 and 2023.

Senegal
Abdoulaye Wade ran for presidency seven times, and lost to incumbent president in 1978, 1983, 1988, 1993. He won in 2000 and 2007, and lost again most recently in 2012.

Seychelles
Philippe Boullé has unsuccessfully run for President five times (1993, 2001, 2006, 2011 and 2015).
Wavel Ramkalawan, leader of the Seychelles National Party, has run for President six times. He lost in 1998, 2001, 2006, 2011 and 2015, ranking second place every election with huge minority, and won in 2020.

Tanzania
Ibrahim Lipumba, leader of the Civic United Front, has run for President four times (1995, 2000, 2005 and 2010).

Zambia
Hakainde Hichilema, leader of UPND contested in the 2006, 2008, 2011, 2015, 2016 and 2021 elections, the last of which he won.
Godfrey Miyanda, leader of the Heritage Party, has run for President four times (2001, 2006, 2008 and 2011).

Asia

Hong Kong
 Avery Ng
 Bull Tsang
 Frederick Fung, initially gained success in almost every election, including District Council, Urban Council and Legislative Council election since 1983. However, since 2015, Fung faced consecutive failures in every election he participated, including 2015 (District Council), 2016 (Legislative Council), March 2018 (Democratic Primary), November 2018 (Legislative Council By-election) and 2019 (District Council). He lost popularity because of his unwillingness to retire, as the Pro-democracy supporters having negative feelings on gerontocracy.
 Christine Fong, has run for Legislative elections five times since 2008, but failed every time.

India
Hotte Paksha Rangaswamy was a political leader from the Indian state of Karnataka, who had a penchant for contesting elections. He is a Guinness World Record holder for having contested the highest number of elections—he unsuccessfully did so 86 times.
Kaka Joginder Singh (alias Dharti Pakad meaning "one who clings to the ground", earned after several unsuccessful runs for President of India) was a textile owner who contested and lost over 300 elections in India. Although his nomination papers were usually disregarded by the election commission, he reached his high-water mark during the 1992 presidential election, in which he earned fourth place in the polling with 1,135 votes, eventually losing to Shankar Dayal Sharma.
Dr. K Padmarajan, a doctor turned politician from the state of Tamil Nadu, had contested 199 elections, and lost all of them. Limca Book of Records named him as "India's most unsuccessful candidate".

Indonesia
Prabowo Subianto, former Army lieutenant general, ran unsuccessfully as president and vice president three times: in 2009, as the running mate for Megawati Sukarnoputri, and in 2014 and 2019 as a presidential candidate. On August 2022, Prabowo announced that he accepted Gerindra Party's nomination to contest the 2024 presidential election, marking his fourth consecutive bid for national leadership and the third for the presidency.

Iran
 Mohsen Rezaee ran for president four times, in 2005, 2009, 2013 and 2021. He was defeated thrice and withdrew once (in 2005). Rezaee had previously ran for an Iranian Parliament seat in 2000, but had not succeeded.
 Mohammad Bagher Ghalibaf (see Electoral history of Mohammad Bagher Ghalibaf) ran for president three times, in 2005, 2013 and 2017. He was defeated twice and withdrew once.

Israel
Vladimir Herczberg, a nuclear physicist. Ran for Mayor of Beersheba and for a Knesset seat twice, and ran for the leadership of the Likud party in its 2012 leadership election. Also ran for the leadership of the Jewish Agency, World Jewish Congress, and the Euro-Asian Jewish Congress.

Japan
 Bin Akao ran in numerous elections for his Greater Japan Patriotic Party until 1989, one year prior to his death.
 Mac Akasaka, real name Makoto Tonami, was a candidate for many political offices, especially the governor of Tokyo 2012, 2016 and mayor of Osaka in 2014.
 Yūtokutaishi Akiyama, an engraver artist, photographer, was a candidate for Governor of Tokyo 1975 and 1979, bringing pop art into the process.
 Teruki Gotō was a candidate for Mayor of Chiyoda Ward, Tokyo (2013), City Assembly of Chiyoda (2015), and the Governor of Tokyo (2016).
Hideyoshi Seizo Hashiba ran in numerous elections from 1976 to 2011.
Mitsuo Matayoshi (alias Jesus Matayoshi), leader of the World Economic Community Party and self-proclaimed Messiah, has run in at least nine local and national elections since 1997.
Yoshiro Nakamatsu (alias Dr. NakaMats), inventor and perennial candidate in Tokyo, has unsuccessfully campaigned to be elected Governor of Tokyo numerous times since 1995, most recently in 2014.

Philippines

Pascual Racuyal unsuccessfully ran for President 11 times (1935, 1941, 1946, 1949, 1953, 1957, 1961, 1965, 1969, 1981 and 1986), although he was disqualified on all but two (1935 and 1969).
Elly Pamatong was disqualified in running for president at least twice (2004 and 2010). After his death in 2021, people asked if he will run in the 2022 presidential election, as his death was not announced to the public.

Singapore
Ooi Boon Ewe has applied four times (1999, 2005, 2011 and 2017) to run for President, all unsuccessfully. He had also tried to contest both the 2006 and 2011 general elections, both times of which he failed to be nominated.
Zeng Guo Yuan
 Chee Soon Juan

Taiwan
Soong Chu-yu, Chairman of People First Party, Governor of Taiwan Province (1993–1998) , ran for president four times (2000, 2012, 2016, and 2020) and for vice president once (2004).
Pan Han-shen, leader of Trees Party and former leader of Green Party Taiwan, a five-time candidate of the member of the Legislative Yuan.

Turkey 

 Doğu Perinçek, chairman of the Patriotic Party, ran for parliament eight times (1991, 1995, 1999, 2002, 2007, 2011, June 2015 and November 2015).  He also unsuccessfully ran for presidency in 2018.

Europe

Cyprus
 Kostas Kyriacou, otherwise known as "Outopos", has been a candidate for every presidential and parliamentary election since 1998 but has never gained more than 1% of the vote.

Czech Republic
 Jana Bobošíková is known for a series of unsuccessful candidatures in various elections. She unsuccessfully ran two times for President of the Czech Republic (2008 and 2013), the Chamber of Deputies (2010 and 2013), the Senate (2010 and 2012), Mayor of Prague (2010) and general manager of Czech Television (2009).
 Petr Hannig is the leader of Party of Common Sense. Since 2002, he has repeatedly run for the Chamber of Deputies and Senate. He also ran for Czech presidency in 2018 election., but failed as well, ending last but one with 0,57% of votes. He also wanted to run in 2023 presidential election but failed to get nomination.
 Miroslav Sládek ran for the Czechoslovak presidency in 1992. After dissolution of Czechoslovakia he sought the Czech presidency in 1993, 1998 and 2018. He withdrawn from 2018 election due to failure of his party in the 2017 legislative election.
 Jan Švejnar unsuccessfully ran for the Czech presidency in 2008. He also ran for the position in 2013 but withdrew. He planned to run for the office in 2018 but he did not receive political support. Some politicians noted that Švejnar lives in the United States and "shows up in the Czech Republic only when there is a presidential election."

Finland
Paavo Väyrynen ran for President four times (1988, 1994, 2012 and 2018), first three times as the candidate of Centre Party and then fourth time as an independent candidate.

France
Arlette Laguiller, leader of the Workers' Struggle, a Trotskyist party, has been a candidate for President six times (1974, 1981, 1988, 1995, 2002 and 2007).
Jean-Marie Le Pen, leader of the far-right National Front, has been a candidate for President five times (1974, 1988, 1995, 2002 (in which he unprecedentedly finished second in the first round of voting, proceeding to the second round of voting which he lost to the incumbent, Jacques Chirac), and 2007).
 Jacques Chirac himself ran for the Presidency four times (1981, 1988, 1995 and 2002), the latter one as incumbent.
 François Mitterrand as well ran for the Presidency four times (1965, 1974, 1981 and 1988), the latter one as incumbent.
 Jean-Luc Mélenchon, leader of the left wing La France insoumise, has run for President three times (2012, 2017, and 2022).

Germany
 
Helmut Palmer (1930–2004) stood without any success for about 250 elections as mayor in villages and cities in southwestern Germany and various times as independent candidate for the Bundestag. His son Boris Palmer became mayor of Tübingen.

Iceland
Ástþór Magnússon is an Icelandic businessman and politician who unsuccessfully campaigned for the post of President of Iceland five times; in 1996, 2000, 2004, 2012 and 2016.

Ireland
Seán Dublin Bay Rockall Loftus, a longtime member of Dublin City Council (1974–1999), stood in 14 elections for Dáil Éireann, the lower house of the Irish parliament, between 1961 and 1997. He was only elected once, in 1981, and served as a TD for just 8 months. He also stood unsuccessfully in two elections to the European Parliament.

Italy
Marco Pannella is described by many as a perennial candidate, even though he was actually elected multiple times as a member of the Italian Parliament, the European Parliament, and the municipal councils of a handful of cities.

Malta 

 Nazzareno Bonniċi, known more in Malta by the affectionate nickname 'Żaren tal-Ajkla', part of his tongue-in-cheek unregistered Partit tal-Ajkla (en. Eagle Party), has been a perennial candidate in the 2013, 2017 and 2022 Maltese general elections, and the 2004, 2009, 2014 and 2019 European Parliament elections in Malta. In a surprise move that later had the Maltese media speculate and overestimate his probable success, thousands showed up for Nazzareno's mass meeting in preparation for the 2013 general election held front of the Parish Church in Żabbar, the town where he resides. He only received 47 votes, amounting to 0.02% of the Maltese electorate, in the 2013 election. He would receive 71 votes in the 2022 general election, amounting to 0.00019% of the Maltese electorate.

Netherlands 

 Johan Vlemmix was a candidate for the Tweede Kamer in 2002, 2003, 2012, 2021 and for the local council of Eindhoven in 2010. He was unsuccessful in every election.
 Florens van der Spek leader of the evangelical party Jesus Lives participated in the 2014 Dutch municipal elections, 2014 European Parliament election in the Netherlands 2015 Dutch provincial elections, 2017 Dutch general election and 2021. However his party's primary purpose is making Jesus known to the people.

Poland
Janusz Korwin-Mikke unsuccessfully ran for President five times (1995, 2000, 2005, 2010 and 2015). He also unsuccessfully ran for Polish parliament nine times (1993, 1997, 2001, 2004 (two times, by-elections for Senate), 2005, 2007, 2013 and 2015), for European Parliament (2004, 2019), four times for regional assemblies (2002, 2006, 2007, 2010) and three times for President of Warsaw (2006, 2010, 2018). However, in 2014 he was elected for member of European Parliament and, in 2019, after a 26-year break, for member of Sejm, starting from Confederation Liberty and Independence list.
Kornel Morawiecki unsuccessfully ran for President three times in 1990, 2010 and 2015, achieving necessary 100,000 signatures to be registered as candidate only in 2010. He also unsuccessfully ran for Sejm in 1991, and for Senate in 2007. Eventually, he succeeded for the first time when he became an MP in 2015.

Romania
Corneliu Vadim Tudor, former president and founder of PRM, unsuccessfully ran for President five times in 1996, 2000, 2004, 2009 and 2014. His biggest score was in 2000 when he gained 33.2% in the second round against Ion Iliescu.

Russia
Gennady Zyuganov ran for President in 1996, 2000, 2008 and 2012. His biggest score was in 1996, when he gained 40.7% in the second round against Boris Yeltsin.
Vladimir Zhirinovsky unsuccessfully ran for President of Russia six times: in 1991, 1996, 2000, 2008, 2012 and 2018. In addition unsuccessfully ran for Governor of Belgorod Oblast in 1999. Also, 2 times he participated in the election of the Chairman of the State Duma, in 2003 and 2011, but both times unsuccessfully.
Lev Ubozhko unsuccessfully participated in elections of different levels. He ran for the special election to the Supreme Soviet of Russia in 1992 and 1993. He also ran for the State Duma in 1993, 1995 and 1998 (special election in single-mandate constituency). In 1994, at a special election, he unsuccessfully ran for the Federation Council from the Chelyabinsk Oblast. In 1996, he unsuccessfully ran for Governor of the Chelyabinsk Oblast. He ran for President in 1991 and 1996, but both times he was denied registration.
Grigory Yavlinsky ran for President in 1996, 2000, 2012 (denied) and 2018.
Oleg Bulayev about 40 times participated as a candidate in the elections in various regions of the country. For several years he tried to become an MP in North Ossetia, Udmurtia, Sakhalin Oblast, Saratov Oblast, Krasnodar Krai, Ulyanovsk Oblast, Smolensk Oblast, Arkhangelsk Oblast, Kemerovo Oblast, Yakutia, Kalmykia, Chechnya, Vladimir Oblast, Crimea, Mari El, Tatarstan and other regions. In 2013 he was elected as member of the Volgograd City Duma. In 2014 he ran for Governor of Volgograd Oblast, lost the election gaining 2.21%. In 2018 he ran for president, but withdrew.

Slovakia
František Mikloško ran for presidency of Slovakia in 2004, 2009 and 2019 election and always failed to advance to second round.

United Kingdom
Bill Boaks contested general elections and by-elections for a period of 30 years under various descriptions, most famously under the "Public Safety Democratic Monarchist White Resident" banner. Boaks' main concern was public safety on the roads and believed that pedestrians should have the right of way at all times. In the 1982 Glasgow Hillhead by-election he received only five votes, one of the lowest recorded in a modern British parliamentary election. He died in 1986 from injuries sustained in a traffic collision two years earlier.
Arthur Hunnable's name never appeared on a ballot paper, but he campaigned and announced that he would stand in almost every by-election from 1907 to 1909, and also in Jarrow at the 1918 general election.
Winston McKenzie, who now stands as an English Democrats candidate, has previously stood since 2002 as an independent candidate in the Brent East by-election and in the 2008 Mayoral election, and for Veritas, UKIP, and founded his own Unity Party.
David Sutch ran in 39 general elections and by-elections under the name Screaming Lord Sutch for the British House of Commons, and one election for the European Parliament, only ever winning more than 1,000 votes on a single occasion. He first ran in 1963 on the National Teenage Party ticket for the seat left vacant by the resignation of John Profumo. He founded the Official Monster Raving Loony Party in 1983 and led it until his suicide in 1999.
Sutch's successor as Monster Raving Loony Party leader, Alan "Howling Laud" Hope has contested 13 by-elections and five general elections between 2001 and 2016. His highest vote total has been 553, achieved at both Aldershot in the 2005 general election and the 2011 Leicester South by-election. The latter was also his highest vote share of 1.6%. Hope's highest placing in a parliamentary election has been fourth (of eight candidates) in Richmond Park in 2016. Hope has been elected (unopposed) to seats on parish councils in Devon and Hampshire and was mayor of Ashburton. 
 John Peck ran in the constituency of Nottingham North from 1955 to 1987 and came last every time, bar 1979, in which he came second last. However, in 1987 he won the Nottingham Council seat of Bulwell East.
Lindi St Clair ran in numerous elections for her "Corrective Party", on some occasions standing as "Miss Whiplash".
Richard Huggett contested various elections under banners designed to imitate better-known parties, including as a "Literal Democrat" candidate. This eventually resulted in the Registration of Political Parties Act 1998 being passed to stop this practice.
Nigel Farage has stood for election to the British House of Commons seven times, in five general elections and two by-elections, but has been unsuccessful each time. In the most recent election he declined to contest a seat.  However, he was successful in being elected as a member of the European Parliament five times.

Oceania

Australia
 Charles Bellchambers contested the Division of Barton six times between 1966 and 1987, usually polling a negligible proportion of the vote.
 Alex Bhathal, a social worker, has unsuccessfully stood for the Greens in the Division of Batman six times between 2001 and 2017, increasing the Greens' percentage of the vote from 4.60% in 1998 to 39.49% in 2017 (she did not stand in 2007).
 Ben Buckley, a farmer, has unsuccessfully contested Gippsland in the House of Representatives on 11 occasions. He first contested the seat in 1984, and has contested every election since 2001. An independent on six occasions, Buckley ran as a One Nation candidate in 2004, and has run as a Liberal Democrat in the past four elections (2008, 2010, 2013, and 2016). His best result came in 2010 when he polled 5.52% of the vote.
 Anthony Fels has, contested eight state elections in Western Australia and six federal elections. He was successful on one occasion, winning a seat in the Western Australian Legislative Council in 2005. He first ran for parliament in 1996 and was a member of the Liberal Party until 2008. His later bids for office have included candidacies  and with Family First (2008), Katter's Australian Party (2013), the Mutual Party (2014), the Non-Custodial Parents Party (2017), the United Australia Party (2019), and the Western Australia Party (2022), in addition to several runs as an independent (2010, 2013, 2017, 2021).
 Shirley de la Hunty (née Strickland), a multiple Olympic gold medallist in athletics, unsuccessfully contested six state elections in Western Australia and seven federal elections. Her candidacies spanned from 1971 to 1996 and included runs for the lower and upper houses at both state and federal levels. She stood a number of times for the Australian Democrats, while the rest of her runs were made as an independent candidate.
 Pauline Hanson, founder and leader of One Nation, a right-wing populist political party had unsuccessfully contested state and federal elections before being election in the 2016 federal election. Ran in the 2001, 2004, 2007 for the federal Senate Queensland, Ran in the 2003 and 2011 for the NSW state Legislative Council, and 2009 and 2015 for QLD State election. 
 Teresa van Lieshout, a resident of Perth, has unsuccessfully contested seven state and federal elections standing for various constituencies in Western Australia. She has stood for the Parliament of Western Australia as a One Nation candidate at the 2005 election, and as an independent at the 2006 Victoria Park by-election, 2013 state election, and 2014 Vasse by-election. For Federal Parliament, she ran as an independent at the 2004 election and 2014 special senate election, and as a Protectionist candidate at the 2013 election. In August 2015, she announced she would be contested the eighth election, the 2015 Canning by-election. Teresa stood for the Senate in NSW in the 2016 Federal Election, and as an independent in the 2018 Batman by-election.
 Jim Saleam, Veteran anti-immigration activist and president of the Australia First Party has contested six times in state and federal elections.

New Zealand
Stephen Berry has unsuccessfully ran in 10 elections on libertarian or right-wing positions (2002, 2004, 2011, 2013 mayoral, 2013 local council, 2014, 2016, 2017, 2018, 2020). In 2020, Berry was 9th on the party list for ACT New Zealand and ACT got 10 seats, which means if he had not resigned from running and ACT got the same result, Berry would have been elected as a Member of Parliament.
Colin Craig, the founder and long-time leader of the right-wing Conservative Party of New Zealand (now known as the New Conservative Party) is a perennial candidate. Craig is a real estate millionaire who entered politics in 2011 with his new party, which ran on a Christian conservative anti-abortion, pro-free speech, pro-gun rights, anti-Māori seats, pro-child abuse and pro-prison labour platform. He ran unsuccessfully for the Mayor of Auckland before founding the party, and then lead the party for 4 years before being suspended over multiple sexual harassment scandals.
Bill Maung, a Burmese immigrant and political advisor to Black Power, stood for election multiple times in both local and parliamentary elections as an independent candidate.
Frank Moncur stood for Parliament nine times, five times for Mayor of Wellington and nine times for the Wellington City Council, usually as a "private enterprise" candidate, between 1971 and 1996.
Saul Goldsmith contested ten city council and four mayoral elections, plus one council by-election, in Wellington over a 30-year period. He also stood in two general elections for the National Party as well as a by-election as an independent National candidate.
Peter Wakeman has unsuccessfully run for Christchurch mayor in 1998, 2007, 2010, 2013, and 2019. He also ran for mayor of Waimakariri in 2010. He has run for parliament in four by-elections, Tauranga in 1993 and 2022, Te Tai Hauāuru in 2004, and Mount Albert in 2017.

References

Political metaphors referring to people
Political terminology
Elections terminology